Active stretching eliminates force and its adverse effects from stretching procedures or it can also be defined as a stretch that requires you to retain a posture without any help other than the strength of your agonist's muscles is known as an active stretch. Active stretching stimulates and prepares muscles for use during exercise.  Active stretches not only stretch the muscles and tissues, but prepares the muscles for the action by activating and warming them up or a stretch that requires you to retain a posture without any help other than the strength of your agonist's muscles is known as an active stretch.. 

Before describing the principles on which active stretching is based, the terms agonist and antagonist must be clarified. Agonist refers to the actively contracting muscle or muscles while their opposing muscles are termed antagonists.

The neuromechanisms conceptualized by Sir Charles Sherrington (1857 - 1956), “the philosopher of the nervous system”, as applied to active stretching are:

Reciprocal inhibition — While agonist muscles contract, contraction of the opposing antagonist muscles is inhibited.  (Such as when alternately flexing and extending one's elbow.)
Muscle spindles — Sensory nerve endings in muscle detect the change in length of the muscle and its rate of change.

Force applied to a muscle stimulates the muscle spindles which activate protective reflexes resulting in contraction of that muscle. (Such as the knee jerk response of neurological testing procedures.)

While necessary for sports and ordinary motions, this protective reaction is counterproductive for stretching, i.e., lengthening muscles.

A history of active stretching

Sir Charles Sherrington conceptualized the principle of reciprocal innervation circa 1904 and demonstrated it circa 1913.
A. D. Munrow's work proposed these principles for ‘active’ mobilizing exercises. 1962
While H. A. DeVries, L. E. Holt and others wandered from this course, P. Williams (1937) utilized procedures for his flexion exercises back program. Peters and Peters (1975) further adapted Sherrington's principles into their program of ‘active stretching’, departing from the popular static stretching designed for specific sports, to address mobility of the entire body.
EMG (Electromyographic) studies by S. Blackburn and others have validated Sherrington's principle of reciprocal innervation. Audiovisual electromyography by Peters and Peters supports Sherrington's  principle of reciprocal innervation (inhibition) and his description of the reaction of ‘muscle spindles’ to force. These two principles are the basis of ‘active stretching’ procedures.
There currently are other stretching methods utilizing ‘active’ components in conjunction with force, the use of which Munrow does not concur.
As stated in note number 3 above, Howard and Jean Peters developed and formalized the Active Stretching Program in 1975. It was first published in 1983 with an expanded edition in 1995.

Bibliography
 Munrow, A. D.   PURE AND APPLIED GYMNASTICS. London: Edward Arnold., 1962.
 Jean M. Peters & Howard K. Peters THE FLEXIBILITY MANUAL Sports Kinetics Inc. 1995
 Blackburn, S. E., L. G. Portney. Electromyographic Activity of Back Musculature During Willams’ Flexion Exercises. PHYSICAL THERAPY, Journal of the American Physical Therapy Association. June 1981.

See also
 Stretching
 PNF stretching

References

Stretching